Grand Arrival is the third studio album by Bryn Haworth, released on the A&M Records label. The songs "We're All One" and "Woman Friend" were both released as singles (AMS 7361 and AMS 7371 respectively).

The album is now deleted from the A&M Records catalogue.

Track listing

Personnel

Musicians

Production staff
Production - Audie Ashworth, for Audigram Inc.
Engineering - Ronny Light
Remixing - Chris Kimsey
Recorded at - Crazy Mamas, Nashville
Remixed at - Olympic Studios and Basing Street Studios, London
Design and art direction - Michael Ross
Photography - Gered Mankowitz
Sunrise - Virginia Fass

Packaging
The original paper inner sleeve for the vinyl record carried the lyrics and credits on one side and was printed, on the other side, with a reverse silhouette of the sunrise in the shape of a flying dove.

References

External links 
Grand Arrival at discogs.com

1978 albums
Bryn Haworth albums
A&M Records albums
Albums produced by Audie Ashworth